"All I Got" is a song by English singer-songwriter and musician Newton Faulkner from his debut studio album Hand Built by Robots (2007). The song was released on 19 October 2007 as the album's third single. The song was written by Newton Faulkner, Crispin Hunt and produced by Mike Spencer. The song peaked to number 59 on the UK Singles Chart.

Track listing
Digital download
 "All I Got" - 3:08
 "Full Fat" - 2:50

Credits and personnel
Lead vocals – Newton Faulkner
Producers – Mike Spencer
Lyrics – Crispin Hunt, Newton Faulkner
Label: Ugly Truth

Chart performance

Release history

References

2007 singles
Newton Faulkner songs
Songs written by Newton Faulkner
Songs written by Crispin Hunt
2006 songs